was a Japanese daimyō of the early Edo period who served under the Tokugawa shogunate.  He was the son of the famous Tokugawa general Ii Naomasa. His childhood name was Bennosuke (弁之介).

Naotaka served in the Siege of Osaka in his brother Naokatsu's stead, where he would gain tremendous favor for his exploits at Tennōji.  After the battle, he would be granted his brother's lands at Sawayama in Ōmi Province.  He would finish the construction of Hikone castle in 1622, a project which had been started by his brother in 1603.

Both Naotaka and his father Naomasa are playable characters from the Eastern Army in the original Kessen.

Hikonyan, mascot of Hikone Castle, is based on a folktale about how Naotaka was saved from a lightning strike by a maneki-neko.

Family
 Father: Ii Naomasa
 Mother: Inbu Tokuemon's daughter
 Wife: Akihime, daughter of Hachisuka Iemasa
 Concubines:
 Shunkoin
 Endo clan's daughter
 Ishii clan's daughter
 Children:
 Ii Naozumi (1625-1676)
 Matsuchiyo
 Ii Naohiro
 Ii Naotsuna (1622-1658) by Ishii clan's daughter
 Ii Naoshige (1612-1661) by Endo clan's daughter

External links
 "Hikone-han" on Edo 300 HTML (6 July 2008)
Naramoto Tatsuya (1992). Nihon no kassen: Monoshiri jiten. (Tokyo: Shufu to seikatsusha)

Ii clan
1590 births
1659 deaths
Fudai daimyo